The 2019 Canterbury-Bankstown Bulldogs season was the 85th in the club's history. Coached by Dean Pay, they finished the National Rugby League's 2019 Telstra Premiership in 12th place  and did not qualify for the finals.

Fixtures

Regular season

Ladder

See also
 List of Canterbury-Bankstown Bulldogs seasons

References

Canterbury-Bankstown Bulldogs seasons
Canterbury-Bankstown Bulldogs season